The 1978 Rice Owls football team was an American football team that represented Rice University in the Southwest Conference during the 1978 NCAA Division I-A football season. In their first year under head coach Ray Alborn, the team compiled a 2–9 record.

Schedule

References

Rice
Rice Owls football seasons
Rice Owls football